Teófilo Leuterio Sison (February 29, 1880 – April 13, 1975) was a Philippine legislator and the first Secretary of National Defense of the Philippine Commonwealth.

Early life
Sison was born on February 29, 1880, in Dagupan, Pangasinan, to Benito Sison and Escolástica Leuterio.

He studied at the College of San Alberto Magno, obtaining a Bachelor of Arts degree in 1896 and the University of Santo Tomas, B.A., in the same year. He taught in the public schools of Binmaley, Pangasinan from October 19o0 until June 1901.

Career
On July 1, 1901, he was appointed interpreter for the Court of First Instance Third Judicial District. It was during his term as court interpreter that he married Filomena Solis in Lingayen, Pangasinan on November 19, 1910. He served in such capacity until July 1, 1914, when he was reappointed to a similar position in the 5th District where he remained until September 30, 1914.

After he passed the Philippine Bar examination on September 7, 1914, he established his own law office and engaged in the active practice of his profession.

Legislative career
In June 1916, he was elected Municipal Councilor of Lingayen, a position he held until October 1919. He went on to become Provincial Governor of Pangasinan during the June 1922 election and was re-elected in the general elections of 1925.

Then in June 1928, he was elected for the Second Senatorial District, comprising the provinces of Pangasinan, La Union and Zambales. As Senator during the period 1928–1931, he was Chairman of the Committees on Civil Service and National Enterprise, and member of the following committees: Finance, Public Works and Communication, Appointments, Justice, Municipal and Provincial Governments, Election and Privileges, City of Manila, Commerce and Industry, Labor and Immigration.

During the 9th Legislative Assembly, he was chairman of the Committee of Justice and member of the following committees: Finance, Public Works and Communication, Appointments, Public Instruction, External Relations, Banks Corporations and Franchise, Commerce and Industry, City of Manila, Municipal and Provincial Governments, Labor and Immigration, Civil Service and Library.

Secretary of National Defense
He was appointed Secretary of National Defense on November 1, 1939, during the presidency of Manuel Quezon pursuant to the enactment of Commonwealth Act No. 1 or the National Defense Act.

Death
He died two months after his 95th birthday on April 13, 1975. He was buried at Loyola Memorial Park in Marikina.

See also
List of Secretaries of the Department of National Defense of the Philippines

References
Sison's Biography

1880 births
1975 deaths
Senators of the 10th Philippine Legislature
Senators of the 9th Philippine Legislature
Senators of the 8th Philippine Legislature
Nacionalista Party politicians
Governors of Pangasinan
People from Dagupan
Secretaries of National Defense of the Philippines
20th-century Filipino lawyers
University of Santo Tomas alumni
Burials at the Loyola Memorial Park
Quezon administration cabinet members